Defender(s) or The Defender(s) may refer to:

Defense (military)
Defense (sports)
Defender (association football)

Arts and entertainment

Film and television
 The Defender (1989 film), a Canadian documentary 
 [[The Defender (1994 film)|The Defender (1994 film)]] or The Bodyguard from Beijing The Defender (2004 film), a British-German action film
 "The Defender" (Studio One), a 1957 episode of Studio One The Defenders (1961 TV series), an American courtroom drama
 The Defenders (2010 TV series), an American legal comedy-drama
 The Defender (2021 TV series), a Czech crime drama television series
 The Defenders (miniseries), an American Marvel web TV seriesThe Defenders Saga, the Marvel-Netflix 2010s TV show universe

Gaming
 Defender (card player), a player who plays against the declarer
 Defender (1981 video game)
 Defender (2002 video game), a remake

Literature
 Defenders (comics), a fictional superhero group in Marvel comic books
 The Defender (Kalashnikoff novel), a 1951 novel by Nicholas Kalashnikoff
 The Defender (Thwaites novel), a 1936 novel by F. J. Thwaites
 "The Defenders" (short story), a 1953 short story by Philip K. Dick
 The Chicago Defender, a Chicago-based online newspaper
 Defender, a 2001 novel in C. J. Cherryh's Foreigner series

Music
 Defender (album), a 1987 album by Rory Gallagher
 "Defender" (Peter Andre song), 2010
 "Defender" (Gabriella Cilmi song), 2010
 "Defender", a 1987 song by Manowar from Fighting the World "Defenders", a 2014 song by DragonForce from Maximum Overload "The Defender", a 1982 song by Buckner & Garcia from Pac-Man Fever The Defenders (ballet), a 2007 ballet by William Forsythe
 The Defender (musical), a 1902 musical

Sports
 Defenders Football Club, formerly Sri Lanka Army SC
 Connecticut Defenders, a former American baseball team
 Los Angeles D-Fenders, now the South Bay Lakers, an American basketball team
 Defender, the America's Cup yacht representing the club that currently holds the Cup

Transportation
Aircraft
 Britten-Norman Defender, a multi-role utility transport aircraft
 McDonnell Douglas MD 500 Defender, a light military helicopter
 Fletcher FD-25 Defender, a 1950s American light ground-attack aircraft

Land
 Land Rover Defender, a British 4×4 off-road vehicle
Land Rover Defender (L663), from 2019

Maritime
 Defender (1895 yacht), the 1895 America's Cup winner
 Defender (1982 yacht), a 12-metre class yacht
 , the name of several ships of the Royal Navy
 USS Defender (MCM-2), a mine countermeasures ship of the U.S. Navy
 Defender-class boat, a class of boat of the U.S. Coast Guard 
 Defender-class torpedo boat (1883)

Other uses
 Defenders (Ireland), a Roman Catholic agrarian secret society in 18th century Ireland
 Defender Limited, a British Virgin Islands investment fund
 Defender Mountain, on the American-Canadian border
 Windows Defender, anti-malware software
 Defendant or defender in Scots law for civil cases

 See also 
 
 
 
 Defender of the Faith (disambiguation)
 Defendor'', a 2009 Canadian-American film
 Defense (disambiguation)
 Defensor (disambiguation)
 Guardian (disambiguation)
 HMS Defender, a list of ships of the Royal Navy
 Protector (disambiguation)
 Public defender, a lawyer appointed to represent people who cannot afford to hire a lawyer